Idol stjörnuleit (season 2) was the second season of Idol stjörnuleit. Hildur Vala Einarsdóttir won over Aðalheiður Ólafsdóttir.

Finals

Finalists
(ages stated at time of contest)

Live show details

Heat 1 (19 November 2004)

Notes
Brynja Valdimarsdóttir and Valgerður Friðrikdóttir advanced to the top 10 of the competition. The other 6 contestants were eliminated.
Davïð Smári Harðarson and Lísebet Hauksdóttir returned for a second chance at the top 10 in the Wildcard Round.

Heat 2 (26 November 2004)

Notes
Margrét Lára Þórarinsdóttir and Nanna Kristín Jóhannsdóttir advanced to the top 10 of the competition. The other 6 contestants were eliminated.
Júlíus Bjargþór Daníelsson and Rakel Björk Haraldsdóttir returned for a second chance at the top 10 in the Wildcard Round.

Heat 3 (3 December 2004)

Notes
Ylfa Lind Gylfadóttir and Hildur Vala Einarsdóttir advanced to the top 10 of the competition. The other 6 contestants were eliminated.
Einir Guðlaugsson, Eva Hlín Samúelsdóttir and Guðrún Birna Ingimundardóttir returned for a second chance at the top 10 in the Wildcard Round.

Heat 4 (10 December 2004)

Notes
Aðalheiður Ólafsdóttir and Helgi Þór Arason advanced to the top 10 of the competition. The other 6 contestants were eliminated.
Ester Ágústa Guðmundsdóttir returned for a second chance at the top 10 in the Wildcard Round.

Wildcard round (17 December 2004)

Notes
Davïð Smári Harðarson and Lísebet Hauksdóttir received the highest number of votes, and completed the top 10.

Live Show 1 (14 January 2005)
Theme: My Idol

Live Show 2 (21 January 2005)
Theme: Disco Hits

Live Show 3 (28 January 2005)
Theme: Songs by Sálin

Live Show 4 (4 February 2005)
Theme: Songs from Keflavïk

Live Show 5 (11 February 2005)
Theme: Film Hits

Live Show 6 (18 February 2005)
Theme: Big Band

Live Show 7 (25 February 2005)
Theme: Songs from New York

Live Show 8: Semi-final (4 March 2005)
Theme: 80s Hits

Live final (11 March 2005)

External links
Official Website via Web Archive

Idol stjörnuleit
2004 Icelandic television seasons
2005 Icelandic television seasons